Ermal Sako (born 8 May 1989 in Vlorë) is an Albanian professional footballer who plays for Albpetrol Patos in the Albanian Second Division.

References

External links
 Profile - FSHF

1989 births
Living people
Footballers from Vlorë
Albanian footballers
Association football midfielders
KF Çlirimi players
KF Himara players
KF Apolonia Fier players
KF Bylis Ballsh players
KS Egnatia Rrogozhinë players
KS Albpetrol Patos players
Kategoria Superiore players
Kategoria e Parë players
Kategoria e Dytë players